The poets listed below were either born in the United States or else published much of their poetry while living in that country.

A

B

C

D

E

F

G

H

I–J

K

L

M

N

O

P

Q
George Quasha (born 1942)

R

S

T

U–V

W

X–Z

See also

Academy of American Poets
American poetry
List of English-language poets
List of Jewish American poets
List of poets
List of years in poetry
Poetry Foundation
Poetry Society of America

External links
Guide to the Darrell Kerr Correspondence with American Poets and Publishers. Special Collections and Archives, The UC Irvine Libraries, Irvine, California.

 
United States
poets